Accra canthararcha is a species of moth of the family Tortricidae. It is found in the Democratic Republic of Congo.

References

Moths described in 1937
Tortricini
Moths of Africa
Endemic fauna of the Democratic Republic of the Congo